Nitropentadecene, or more precisely (E)-1-nitropentadec-1-ene, is a highly toxic unsaturated nitroalkene, the only aliphatic nitro compound known to be synthesized by insects. It is produced by termite soldiers of genus Prorhinotermes (Isoptera, Rhinotermitidae) as a defensive chemical. Nitropentadecene is biosynthesized and stored in one of the exocrine glands, a frontal gland, of termite soldiers, and it is released upon attack of enemy.

References 

Nitro compounds
Alkene derivatives